The Amitié was a three-masted frigate of approximately 400 tons displacement in the late 18th century.  The majority of records regarding the ship come from its transportation of the people who were to become known as Cajuns. Amitié was the fifth of seven ships that took part in the exodus of Acadians from France to Louisiana in 1785.  On August 20 of that year, under the command of Captain Joseph Beltrémieux, it departed from the French port of Nantes carrying 68 families, a total of 270 Acadians, to Louisiana.  They arrived at Lafourche on November 8, 1785.  Six passengers died during the 80-day voyage after sickness spread through the ship.

The ship was called Amitié when it departed from France, but was referred to as Amistad when it arrived in Louisiana, which was then a Spanish colony.

See also 
History of the Acadians

References 
Braud, Gérard-Marc From Nantes to Louisiana, La Rainette Inc; English edition, 2001, .

External links 
History and passenger manifest
Acadian history
"Color" photo of the ship

Acadian history
Age of Sail ships of France
Individual sailing vessels
History of Louisiana